Lau Wing Yip is a Hong Kong former footballer who played as a midfielder and winger.

Career

Lau started his career with Hong Kong side Happy Valley.

References

External links
 Law Wing Yip at 11v11

Association football midfielders
Association football wingers
Happy Valley AA players
Hong Kong international footballers
Hong Kong First Division League players
Hong Kong footballers
Living people
Year of birth missing (living people)